Stari Slatinik  is a village in the municipality of Brodski Stupnik in the central part of Brod-Posavina County, Croatia.

References

Populated places in Brod-Posavina County